Dorothy Esther Butterfield Goddard (15 August 1909 – October 1991) is an English athlete who competed in the 1934 British Empire Games.

At the 1934 Empire Games, she won the bronze medal in the 880 yards event.

References

External links
commonwealthgames.com results

1909 births
1991 deaths
English female middle-distance runners
Athletes (track and field) at the 1934 British Empire Games
Commonwealth Games bronze medallists for England
Commonwealth Games medallists in athletics
Medallists at the 1934 British Empire Games